The filmography of Celeste Buckingham, primarily known as a recording artist, comprises television roles and/or guest appearances. Overall, she has been cast in six productions made for the medium, including two reality shows and two morning shows, one TV special as well one TV documentary. Most notably her name was credited on the second season of Česko Slovenská SuperStar (2011), a singing competition based on the American Idol or rather British Pop Idol series. As such, the reality was watched by an average of 1,47 million viewers in the Czech Republic with Buckingham eventually coming as the tenth-place finalist.

On 9 May 2013, Buckingham was for the first time interviewed live on the U.S. Good Day New York, a morning show produced by WNYW-TV.

Television

Reality shows

Morning shows

TV specials

TV documentaries

See also
 Celeste Buckingham discography
 Celeste Buckingham awards and nominations

References
General

Specific

External links

 Celeste Buckingham (official website)
 
 Celeste Buckingham on Belmont University
 Celeste Buckingham on Discogs
 Celeste Buckingham on FundAnything

 Celeste Buckingham on Mladá fronta DNES
 
 Celeste Buckingham at iREPORT.cz
 Celeste Buckingham at SuperMusic.sk

Filmography
Actress filmographies